Imagining America is a 1989 anthology film consisting of four shorts with the central theme being life in the United States.  It was originally broadcast on the PBS television series American Playhouse.

Overview
Imagining America is an anthology of four short films by different directors. Ralph Bakshi's This Ain't Bebop is about a man's odyssey through surreal downtown Los Angeles as he tries to find the life he once had. Ed Lachman's Get Your Kicks on Route 66 tells the story of America's famous highway. Tribe by Matt Mahurin examines myths in American society. Reflections of a Native Son by Mustapha Khan is a stylized portrait of the South Bronx district of New York City.

Style
The original TV series American Playhouse is produced by John H. Williams, and it is from this series the four pieces to this anthology comes. Together they give a personal view of America. Only one of the four, Ralph Bakshi's This Ain't Bebop, is a narrative, while two others are documentaries: Ed Lachman's Get Your Kicks on Route 66 is about the great American '50s highway and Mustapha Khan's Reflections of a Native Son is a vivid look at the teenage subculture of South Bronx. The fourth piece is Matt Mahurin's Tribe, a cross between impressionist documentary, music video and live-action photo-essay.

Cast
 Harvey Keitel as himself
Craig Stark as Young Harvey Keitel
 Ron Thompson as Beatnik Poet
 Margaret Howell as Beat Poetess
 Dean Hill as Neal Cassidy
 Sean Heyman as Hipster
 Kara "Chavez" Sachs as Street Walker
 Rick Singer as Neal Cassady
 John Nesci as The Narrator
 Mary Pat Gleason

See also
United States in the 1950s
The Beat Generation
American Pop-1981 animated film by Bakshi similar in content

References

External links

This Ain't Bebop on YouTube
The entire film on YouTube

American anthology films
1989 films
Films directed by Ralph Bakshi
American television films
American Playhouse
1980s English-language films